Ziqan (also Romanized as Zīqān; also known as Zīqūn) is a village in Pol Beh Pain Rural District, Simakan District, Jahrom County, Fars Province, Iran. At the 2006 census, its population was 221, in 45 families.

References 

Populated places in Jahrom County